

First Spanish Colony 1492-1801

Governors and Viceroys of the Indies
1492-1500 Admiral Christopher Columbus, as Viceroy of the Indies
1496-1498 Bartolomeo Columbus, as Adelantado
1500-1502 Comendador Francisco de Bobadilla, as Governor of the Indies
1502-1509 Comendador Frey Nicolás de Ovando y Cáceres, as Governor of the Indies
1509-1518 Second Admiral Diego Columbus, as Governor of the Indies until 1511, thereafter as Viceroy of the Indies
1515-1516 Licentiate Cristóbal Lebrón, in connection with Royal Audiencia
1516-1519 Luis de Figueroa, Bernardino de Manzanedo, and Ildefonso de Santo Domingo, friars of the order of San Jerónimo
1519-1520 Licentiate Rodrigo de Figueroa
1520-1524 Second Admiral Diego Columbus
1524-1528 Royal Audiencia, in connection with judges Gaspar de Espinosa and Alonso de Zuazo

Governors and Captains-General
1528-1531 Sebastián Ramírez de Fuenleal, Bishop of Santo Domingo and Concepción de la Vega
1531-1533 Alonso de Zuazo and the Royal Audiencia
1533-1540 Licentiate Alonso de Fuenmayor, Bishop of Santo Domingo and Concepción de la Vega
1540-1543 Third Admiral Luis Colón, 1st Duke of Veragua
1543-1549 Licentiate Alonso López de Cerrato
1549-1556 Licentiate Alonso de Fuenmayor, Archbishop of Santo Domingo
1556-1558 Licentiate Alonso de Maldonado
1558-1560 Licentiate Juan López Cepeda
1560-1561 Juan Echagoyan
1561-1564 Alonso Arias de Herrera
1564-1565 Antonio de Osorio
1565-1567 Alonso de Grajeda
1567-1568 Licentiate Diego de Vera
1568-1572 Antonio de Mexia
1572-1576 Francisco de Vera
1576-1581 Gregorio González de Cuenca
1581-1583 Licentiate Arceo
1583-1587 Licentiate Cristóbal de Ovalle
1590-1597 Lope de Vega Portocarrero
1597-1601 Diego de Osorio
1601-1608 Antonio de Osorio
1608-1624 Diego Gómez de Sandoval
1624-1634 Diego de Acuña
1634-1646 Maestre de Campo Juan Bitrián de Viamonte
1646-1649 Nicolás Velasco Altamirano
1649-1652 Maestre de Campo Gabriel de Chaves Osorio
1652-1657 Bernardino Meneses y Bracamonte, Count of Peñalba 
1657-1658 Félix de Zúñiga y Avellaneda
1658-1660 Andrés Pérez Franco
1660-1662 Juan Francisco de Montemayor Córdoba y Cuenca
1662-1670 Juan de Balboa y Mogrovejo
1670-1671 Pedro de Carvajal y Cobos
1671-1677 Maestre de Campo Ignacio de Zayas Bazán
1677-1679 Dr. Juan de Padilla Guardiola y Guzmán
1679-1684 Maestre de Campo Francisco de Segura Sandoval y Castilla
1684-1689 Maestre de Campo Andrés de Robles
1689-1698 Admiral Ignacio Pérez Caro
1698-1699 Maestre de Campo Gil Correoso Catalán
1699-1702 Severino de Manzaneda
1702-1706 Admiral Ignacio Pérez Caro
1706-1707 Licentiate Sebastián de Cerezada y Girón
1707-1713 Guillermo Morfi
1713-1714 Brigadier Pedro de Niela y Torres
1714-1715 Colonel Antonio Landeche
1715-1723 Brigadier Fernando Constanzo y Ramírez, Knight of Santiago
1723-1732 Colonel Francisco de la Rocha y Ferrer
1732-1739 Brigadier Alfonso de Castro y Mazo
1739-1750 Brigadier Pedro Zorrilla y de San Martín, Marquis of la Gándara Real
1750      Brigadier Juan José Colomo
1750-1751 Lieutenant Rey José de Zunnier de Basteros
1751-1759 Brigadier Francisco Rubio y Peñaranda
1759-1771 Field-Marshal Manuel de Azlor y Urries
1771-1779 Brigadier José Solano y Bote
1779-1785 Brigadier Isidoro de Peralta y Rojas
1785-1786 Colonel Joaquín García y Moreno
1786-1788 Brigadier Manuel González de Torres
1788-1801 Brigadier Joaquín García y Moreno

French Colony

Governors
1801-1802 General Toussaint Louverture
1802-1803 General Antoine Nicolas Kerverseau
1803-1808 General Louis Marie Ferrand
1808-1809 General L. Dubarquier

Second Spanish Colony 1809-1821

Governors and Captains-General
1809-1811 Brigadier Juan Sánchez Ramírez
1811-1813 Colonel Manuel Caballero y Masot
1813-1818 Brigadier Carlos de Urrutia y Matos
1818-1821 Brigadier Sebastián Kindelán y O´Regan
1821 Brigadier Pascual Real

Third Spanish Colony 1861-1865

Governors and Captains-General
1861-1862 Lieutenant-General Pedro Santana
1862-1863 Lieutenant-General Felipe Ribero y Lemoine
1863-1864 Brigadier Carlos de Vargas
1864-1865 Lieutenant-General José de la Gándara y Navarro

See also
Captaincy General of Santo Domingo
Real Audiencia of Santo Domingo
History of the Dominican Republic

Sources
  Gobernadores Isla de Santa Domingo

 01
Colonial governors
Spanish West Indies

Santo Domingo
Colonial governors
Heads of state of the Dominican Republic
Santo Domingo
Santo Domingo
Santo Domingo
Santo Domingo
Santo Domingo
Santo Domingo
Santo Domingo
Santo Domingo